Éva Riffet (born 5 December 1974, in Paris) is a French former synchronized swimmer who competed in the 1996 Summer Olympics.

References

1974 births
Living people
Swimmers from Paris
French synchronized swimmers
Olympic synchronized swimmers of France
Synchronized swimmers at the 1996 Summer Olympics